Eshaan Akbar (born 14 August 1984) is an English comedian, writer and actor. He is also known as "Michael Pakintyre" on Twitter – the Bangladeshi-Pakistani version of comedian Michael McIntyre.

Early life
Akbar is a Briton of Pakistani and Bangladeshi ancestry. Born in Whitechapel, east London, he moved with his family to Essex where he attended Forest School, a private Church of England school in Snaresbrook. Akbar studied Economics, Finance and Management at Queen Mary University of London and worked in wealth management until the 2008 crash. He then completed a master's degree in Global Governance and Public Policy at Birkbeck College, University of London, where his dissertation focused on UK aid provision in the 21st century.

He also worked at the London Borough of Merton Council and HSBC. He also had stints at the British Heart Foundation and Anthony Nolan. Akbar has also worked as a Bollywood dance choreographer and journalist.

Career
Eshaan Akbar began performing stand-up in 2014 doing five-minute spots at open mic nights like We Are Funny Project and the Comedy Cafe. He made the final of the So You Think You're Funny competition and Laughing Horse in that same year. In 2016, he supported Micky Flanagan on his warm up tour. He has gone on to support Dane Baptiste, Hal Cruttenden, Rory Bremner, Jan Ravens, Sindhu Vee, and Jason Manford.

On TV, he has appeared on The Big Asian Stand-Up, Frankie Boyle's New World Order, Mock the Week, QI, The Big Asian Stand-Up Night, Sunday Morning Live and has written for Rob Rinder's Good Year, Bad Year.

On radio, he hosted a regular Saturday afternoon show on the BBC Asian Network., including stints covering The Breakfast Show and Drivetime. He is also the host for the award-winning Nine Twenty Nine podcast for Fiverr and the But Where Are You Really From? podcast for the BBC. He created Panic Room, an Audible podcast, presenting alongside John Robins and Olga Koch.

He is a celebrity Ambassador for the Action on Hearing Loss charity.

Akbar will star in season four of the Netflix series Sex Education.

References

External links
Official page

English male comedians
Living people
1984 births
Alumni of Queen Mary University of London
English people of Pakistani descent
English people of Bangladeshi descent
People from Whitechapel
Comedians from London
Muslim male comedians